Sokol is an urban locality (an urban-type settlement) in Magadan Oblast, Russia, located  north of Magadan on the Kolyma Highway (federal highway M56) section connecting Magadan and Ust-Nera, and is also on the proposed rail link connecting the Amur Yakutsk Mainline with Magadan. Population:

History
It was founded in 1962 and was granted urban-type settlement status in 1964. It is serving and housing the workers of the Sokol Airport.

Transportation
It is the site of the Sokol Airport.

References

Urban-type settlements in Magadan Oblast